The 2018–19 Cypriot Second Division is the 64th season of the Cypriot second-level football league. It began on 15 September 2018 and expect to end in April 2019.

Format
Fourteen teams participated in the 2018–19 Cypriot Second Division. All teams will play against each other twice, once at their home and once away. The team with the most points at the end of the season is crowned champions. The first two teams will be promoted to the 2019–20 Cypriot First Division and the last four teams will be relegated to the 2019–20 Cypriot Third Division.

Team changes from 2017–18

Teams promoted to 2018–19 Cypriot First Division
 Enosis Neon Paralimni

Teams relegated from 2017–18 Cypriot First Division
 Olympiakos Nicosia
 Aris Limassol
 Ethnikos Achna

Teams promoted from 2017–18 Cypriot Third Division
 Onisilos Sotira
 MEAP Nisou
 Akritas Chlorakas

Teams relegated to 2018–19 Cypriot Third Division
 P.O. Xylotymbou
 Ethnikos Assia
 Chalkanoras Idaliou

Stadia and locations

Note: Table lists clubs in alphabetical order.

League table

Results

References

Cypriot Second Division seasons
Cyprus
2018–19 in Cypriot football